Josifovo is a village in the municipality of Valandovo, North Macedonia.

Demographics
According to the 2002 census, the village had a total of 1730 inhabitants. Ethnic groups in the village include:

Macedonians 1288
Turks 274
Serbs 166 
Others 2

Sports
The local football club FK Crvena Zvezda Josifovo used to play in the Macedonian Third Football League.

References

External links

Villages in Valandovo Municipality